is a UK labour law case concerning victimisation for alleging rape, and whether the employee could claim this amounted to sex discrimination. It now falls under the Equality Act 2010 section 27.

Facts
PC Waters said she was raped outside work by a colleague. She complained about it but was then subject to nasty treatment by colleagues and superiors.

Employment Tribunal held that the rape was not actionable discrimination within the SDA, and therefore the complaint was not a ‘protected act’ within Sex Discrimination Act 1975, section 4. The Employment Appeal Tribunal agreed.

Judgment

Court of Appeal
Waite LJ dismissed PC Waters’ appeal.

House of Lords
The House of Lords did not hear an appeal on the SDA 1975 definition of victimisation, but allowed an appeal in respect of negligence over the harassment, unfair treatment and victimisation after the rape complaint.

Lord Hutton stated that if it were shown that psychiatric harm resulted from complaining about rape, ‘it is in the public interest that it should be brought to light so that steps can be taken to seek to ensure that it does not continue, because if officers… are treated as the plaintiff alleges, citizens will be discouraged from joining the police, or from continuing to serve in the police after they have joined, with consequent harm to the interests of the community.’

See also

UK labour law
UK employment equality law

Notes

References

United Kingdom labour case law
House of Lords cases
2000 in case law
2000 in British law
History of the Metropolitan Police